The reticulate moray (Muraena retifera) is a moray eel with pharyngeal jaws. It is part of the genus Muraena.

It is native to the southeastern United States, the Bay of Campeche and the Leeward Antilles.

References

External links 

 
 Film of a Reticulate eel eating

reticulate moray
Fauna of the Southeastern United States
Fish of the Eastern United States
Fish of the Gulf of Mexico
Leeward Antilles
reticulate moray